Trachyceras is a genus belonging to the extinct subclass of cephalopods known as ammonites.  Specifically it belongs in the order Ceratitida.  They are distributed in  Afghanistan, Bosnia and Herzegovina, Canada, China, Germany, Hungary, India, Indonesia, Italy, the Russian Federation, Slovenia, United States.

The family to which Trachyceras belongs, the Trachyceratidae, has more or less involute, highly ornamented shells and ceratitic to ammonitic sutures.

References
Notes

Bibliography
 

Trachyceratidae
Triassic ammonites
Carnian genera
Fossils of British Columbia
Fossils of China
Fossils of Italy
Fossils of Germany
Fossils of India
Molluscs described in 1869
Prehistoric cephalopod genera
Ceratitida genera